Qaleh-ye Hajji Mohammad (also Romanized as Qal‘eh-ye Ḩājjī Moḩammad and Qal‘eh-e Ḩājjī Mohammad; also known as Birkeh Hāji, Ghal‘eh Haji Mohammad, Qal‘eh-e ’ājjī, Qal’eh Hāji, and Qal‘eh Ḩājj Moḩammad) is a village in Howmeh Rural District, in the Central District of Lamerd County, Fars Province, Iran. At the 2006 census, its population was 30, in 7 families.

References 

Populated places in Lamerd County